Phiala venusta is a moth in the family Eupterotidae. It was described by Francis Walker in 1865. It is found in Sierra Leone.

The wings are silvery white, with an exterior oblique line of black points. These are sometimes connected and the line is always entire towards the interior border of the forewings.

References

Moths described in 1865
Eupterotinae